Lamination is the technique/process of manufacturing a material in multiple layers, so that the composite material achieves improved strength, stability, sound insulation, appearance, or other properties from the use of the differing materials, such as plastic. A laminate is a permanently assembled object created using heat, pressure, welding, or adhesives.  Various coating machines, machine presses and calendering equipment are used.

Materials
There are different lamination processes, depending primarily on the type or types of materials to be laminated. The materials used in laminates can be identical or different, depending on the process and the object to be laminated.

Textile 
Laminated fabric are widely used in different fields of human activity, including medical and military. Woven fabrics (organic and inorganic based) are usually laminated by different chemical polymers to give them useful properties like chemical resistance, dust, grease, windproofness, photoluminescence (glowing and other light-effects e.g. in high-visibility clothing), tear strength, stiffness, thickness etc.. Coated fabrics may be considered as sub type of laminated fabrics. Nonwoven fabrics (e.g. fiberglass) are also often laminated. According to a 2002 source the nonwovens fabric industry was the biggest single consumer of different polymer binding resins. 

Materials used in production of coated and laminated fabrics are generally subjected to heat treatment. Thermoplastics and thermosetting plastics are equally used in laminating and coating textile industry.
In 2002 primary materials used included polyvinyl acetate, acrylics, polyvinyl chloride (PVC), polyurethanes, and natural and synthetic rubbers. Copolymers and terpolymers were also in use. 

Thin-films of plastics were in wide use as well. Materials varied from polyethylene and PVC to kapton depending on application. In automotive industry for example the PVC/acrylonitrilebutadiene-styrene (ABS) mixtures were often applied for interiors by laminating onto a polyurethane foam to give a soft-touch properties. Specialty films were used in protective clothing, .e.g polytetrafluoroethylene (PTFE), polyurethane etc.

Glass 

An example of a type of laminate using different materials would be the application of a layer of plastic film—the "laminate"—on either side of a sheet of glass—the laminated subject.  Vehicle windshields are commonly made as composites created by laminating a tough plastic film between two layers of glass. This is to prevent shards of glass detaching from the windshield in case it breaks.

Wood 
Plywood is a common example of a laminate using the same material in each layer combined with epoxy. Glued and laminated dimensional timber is used in the construction industry to make beams (glued laminated timber, or Glulam), in sizes larger and stronger than those that can be obtained from single pieces of wood. Another reason to laminate wooden strips into beams is quality control, as with this method each and every strip can be inspected before it becomes part of a highly stressed component.

Building material 
Examples of laminate materials include melamine adhesive countertop surfacing and plywood. Decorative laminates and some modern millwork components are produced with decorative papers with a layer of overlay on top of the decorative paper, set before pressing them with thermoprocessing into high-pressure decorative laminates (HPDL). A new type of HPDL is produced using real wood veneer or multilaminar veneer as top surface. High-pressure laminates consists of laminates "molded and cured at pressures not lower than 1,000 lb per sq in.(70 kg per cm2) and more commonly in the range of 1,200 to 2,000 lb per sq in. (84 to 140 kg per cm2). Meanwhile, low pressure laminate is defined as "a plastic laminate molded and cured at pressures in general of 400 pounds per square inch (approximately 27 atmospheres or 2.8 × 106 pascals).

Paper

Corrugated fiberboard boxes are examples of laminated structures, where an inner core provides rigidity and strength, and the outer layers provide a smooth surface. A starch based adhesive is usually used.

Laminating paper products, such as photographs, can prevent them from becoming creased, faded, water damaged, wrinkled, stained, smudged, abraded, or marked by grease or fingerprints. Photo identification cards and credit cards are almost always laminated with plastic film. Boxes and other containers may be laminated using heat seal layers, extrusion coatings, pressure sensitive adhesives, UV coating, etc.

Lamination is also used in sculpture using wood or resin. An example of an artist who used lamination in his work is the American Floyd Shaman.

Laminates can be used to add properties to a surface, usually printed paper, that would not have them otherwise, such as with the use of lamination paper.  Sheets of vinyl impregnated with ferro-magnetic material can allow portable printed images to bond to magnets, such as for a custom bulletin board or a visual presentation.  Specially surfaced plastic sheets can be laminated over a printed image to allow them to be safely written upon, such as with dry erase markers or chalk.  Multiple translucent printed images may be laminated in layers to achieve certain visual effects or to hold holographic images.  Printing businesses that do commercial lamination keep a variety of laminates on hand, as the process for bonding different types is generally similar when working with thin materials.

Metal 
Electrical equipment such as transformers and motors usually use an electrical steel laminate coatings to form the core of the coils used to produce magnetic fields. The thin lamination reduces the power loss due to eddy currents. Fiber metal laminate is an example of thin metal laminated by, a glass fiber-reinforced and epoxy-glued sheets.

Microelectronics 
Lamination is widely used in production of electronic components such as PV solar cells.

Photo laminators
Three types of laminators are used most often in digital imaging:
 Pouch laminators
 Heated roll laminators
 Cold roll laminators

Film types
Laminate plastic film is generally categorized into these five categories:
 Standard thermal laminating films
 Low-temperature thermal laminating films
 Heat set (or heat-assisted) laminating films
 Pressure-sensitive films
 Liquid laminate

See also
 Laminated bow
 Converting
 Cladding (metalworking)
 Composite laminates
 Composite material
 Carbon-fibre reinforced plastic
 Glass-reinforced plastic
 Delamination
 Void (composites)

References

Composite materials
Airship technology
Glass applications
Articles containing video clips